Cristian Barros Mirabal (born April 9, 2000) is an Uruguayan footballer who currently plays as a winger for Uruguayan Primera División side Albion on loan from Defensor Sporting.

Career
He made his professional debut playing for Defensor Sporting in an Uruguayan Primera División match against Racing de Montevideo on October 20, 2019.

In November 2020, he was loaned to Primera División club Universidad de Chile, being registered, at the beginning, in the youth team. He made his debut at the Chilean Primera División in a match against Deportes La Serena on December 17, 2020, reaching to play seven matches until the end of his loan.

References

External links
 

Living people
2000 births
Footballers from Montevideo
Uruguayan footballers
Uruguayan expatriate footballers
Defensor Sporting players
Universidad de Chile footballers
Albion F.C. players
Uruguayan Primera División players
Chilean Primera División players
Uruguayan Segunda División players
Expatriate footballers in Chile
Uruguayan expatriate sportspeople in Chile
Association football forwards